Sasisena Kavya is a literary book written by Pratap Rai in the 17th century. It is considered as one of the landmark books in the Odia literature.

Synopsis of the book 

The book is mainly based on the love between Ahimanikya the son of a Dewan and Sasisena a princess. It also depicts the tantric and shakti culture of Sonepur. It is said that Ahimanikya and Sasisena were in love in school and married secretly. After their marriage, they came to Sonepur which was also known as Kamitapura during that time.

However, their marriage was rocked by a Tantric maiden named Jynanadei Maluni, (alias Madana Maluni). She was attracted by the beauty of Ahimanikya. One day while Ahimanikya was alone out in the market; Jynanadei Maluni induced him and brought him to her house. Then she transformed Ahimanikya into a lamb by virtue of her tantric power. It is said that during the night time she used to transform the lamb to Ahimanikya and romanced with him. However, during the daytime she used to transformed him to a lamb.

Having lost her husband, a disappointed Sasisena searched Ahimanikya in every corner of the Sonepur kingdom. After some time she got an appointment with the king of Sonepur and was selected to become a soldier in the Sonepur royal army. She was very successful and earned name and fame after she killed a man-eater tiger. The king of Sonepur was so impressed that he desired to give his daughter in marriage to Sasisena. As Sasisena could not reveal her actual identity she was forced to marry the Sonepur's princess. Nonetheless, after marriage she revealed her story to the princess of Sonepur kingdom.

The princess was moved by her pathetic situation and offered all possible help to Sasisena. They searched all places in Sonepur. It was described that then they planned cleverly and build a big tank with four temples on the four corners. A festival was organized for the dedication of the tank and all people of Sonepur were invited for it. Jynanadei Maluni came with Ahimanikya to enjoy the festival. Ahimanikya could recognize Sasisena and informed her secretly by writing on the wall of the temple that she is under the captive of Jynanadei Maluni. A cleaver Sasisena informed the king of Sonepur that she wanted to sacrifice some lambs before Goddess Bhagawati and requested the king to bring the lamb of Jynanadei Maluni.

Jynanadei Maluni brought her lamb and the lamb was no other than Ahimanikya. By the order of his highness, the king of Sonepur, Jynanadei Maluni transformed him to the human form. It was said that at the desire of Sonepur Raja both the princess of Sonepur and Sasisena became the wives of Ahimanikya.

This story is still alive in the memory of people of Subarnapur district. As an evidence to this tantric episode the Sasisena Temple is located in the Sonepur town.

See also
 Paschima Lanka
 Cultural Profile of South Kosal
 Kosalananda Kavya
 Subarnapur district
 Sonepur
 Kosal
 Kosal state movement
 Sureswari Temple
 Subarnameru Temple
 Lankeswari Temple
 Patali Srikhetra

References

External links
Tantric Hedonism of Mahandi Valley 
Tourism in Sonepur

 
Cultural history of Odisha
Hindu texts
Odia literature